Biencourt may refer to:

Places
 Biencourt, Quebec, Canada
 Biencourt, Somme, France
 Biencourt-sur-Orge, Meuse, France

People
 Charles de Biencourt de Saint-Just (1591/1592 - 1623/1624), French nobleman and military officer
 Jean de Biencourt de Poutrincourt et de Saint-Just (1557–1615), French nobleman and colonial governor

See also